Rosario Seaplane Base  is a public-use seaplane base located adjacent to Rosario on Orcas Island in San Juan County, Washington, United States. It is owned by the Rosario Resort.

Facilities and aircraft 
Rosario Seaplane Base has two seaplane landing areas: 7/25 is 2,500 by 1,000 feet (762 x 305 m) and 16/34 is 10,000 by 1,000 feet (3,048 x 305 m). For the 12-month period ending May 31, 2009, the airport had 2,500 aircraft operations, an average of 208 per month: 84% air taxi and 16% general aviation.

Airlines and destinations

References

External links 
 Aerial image from USGS The National Map

Airports in Washington (state)
Airports in San Juan County, Washington
Seaplane bases in the United States